Borough 4 is a borough of Düsseldorf, the state capital of North Rhine-Westphalia, Germany. It covers an area of 12.62 square kilometres and has about 45,000 inhabitants (2020).

Borough 4 is the city's only borough on the west bank of the Rhine and its quarters are popular residential areas. Across the river, it shares borders with Düsseldorf boroughs 5, 1 and 3. West and South-west, the borough is bordered by Rhein-Kreis Neuss and the city of Neuss.

Subdivisions 
Borough 4 is made up of four Stadtteile (city parts):

Economy 
The borough is home to the headquarters of Vodafone Germany, bakery chain Kamps, world-leading tea bag producer Teekanne as well as the Rheinische Post publishing house.

Places of interest

Arts, culture and entertainment 
 Largest Fair on the Rhine (only during July)

Landmarks 
 St. Antonius, Oberkassel

Parks and open spaces 
 Rheinwiesen

Transportation 
The borough is served by numerous railway stations and highway. Stations include a dense net of both Düsseldorf Stadtbahn light rail- and Rheinbahn tram-stations. The borough can also be reached via Bundesautobahn 57 and Bundesstraße 7.

Rhine bridges 
  Theodor-Heuss-Brücke
 Oberkasseler Brücke
 Rheinkniebrücke

Education

The Japanische Internationale Schule in Düsseldorf (JISD) first opened in a church building in Oberkassel on April 21, 1971, before moving to its permanent home in 1973. From 1983 to 2001 junior high school students of the JISD attended classes at the former Lanker School in Oberkassel.

See also 
 Boroughs of Düsseldorf

References

External links 
 Official webpage of the district 

!